Alessandro Sanminiatelli Zabarella (3 August 1840 – 24 November 1910) was an Italian cardinal of the Catholic Church. He served as Latin Patriarch of Constantinople from 1889 until 1901.

Biography
Sanminiatelli Zabarella was born in Radicondoli to Count Ferdinando Sanminiatelli Zabarella and his wife Leopolda Pescatori di Peccioli. He studied at the Archiepiscopal College-Seminary of Pisa, and entered the Almo Collegio Capranica in Rome in 1857. From the Pontifical Roman Seminary he obtained his doctorates in philosophy (1860) and in theology (1864).

Zabarella was ordained to the priesthood by Cardinal Cosimo Corsi on 6 September 1863, and attended La Sapienza University, earning his doctorate in canon law in 1866. From 1861 to 1868 he studied at the Pontifical Academy of Ecclesiastical Nobles, also in Rome. He was raised to the rank of Privy Chamberlain supernumerary in 1867, and Privy chamberlain participantium in 1868. He later became a canon of St. Peter's Basilica.

On 31 July 1874, Zabarella was appointed Grand Almoner and Titular Archbishop of Tyana. He received his episcopal consecration on 14 August from Pope Pius IX. He was named President of the Holy See's Judicial Commission on 23 August 1887 and Auditor-General of the Apostolic Chamber on 29 November 1887.

Pope Leo secretly (in pectore) made him a member of the College of Cardinals in the consistory of 19 June 1899, three days before his appointment as Latin Patriarch of Constantinople on 22 June. Zabarella was published as Cardinal-Priest of Santi Marcellino e Pietro on 15 April 1901. He served as Camerlengo of the Sacred College of Cardinals from 22 June 1903 to 27 March 1905 and participated in the papal conclave of 1903, which elected Pope Pius X.

Zabarella died in Monte Castello at the age of 70. He is buried in the Campo Verano cemetery.

References

External links
Catholic-Hierarchy 
Cardinals of the Holy Roman Church

1840 births
1910 deaths
19th-century Italian Roman Catholic archbishops
20th-century Italian Roman Catholic archbishops
20th-century Italian cardinals
Cardinals created by Pope Leo XIII
Latin Patriarchs of Constantinople
Almo Collegio Capranica alumni
Pontifical Ecclesiastical Academy alumni
Pontifical Roman Seminary alumni
Apostolic Camera